19 Ramadan is the nineteenth day of the ninth month (Ramadan) of the Islamic calendar.

In the conventional Lunar Hijri calendar, this day is the 255th day of the year.

Events

 40 AH - Ali ibn Abi Talib (1st Shi'i Imam) was wounded with the sword of Abd al-Rahman ibn Muljam in the morning during Fajr prayer, Kufa
 570 AH - Battle of the Horns of Hama, an Ayyubid victory over the Zengids, which left Saladin in control of Damascus, Baalbek, and Homs
 The revelation of the whole of Quran to the heart of the Islam Prophet Muhammad (according to the narrations)

Deaths
 556 AH – Tala'i ibn Ruzzik, minister of Fatimid Caliphate, Arab Egyptian poet
 665 AH - Abu Shama Makdisi, Syrian Sunni Qāriʾ, Faqīh, historian and writer
 832 AH - Ghiyāth al-Dīn Jamshīd Kāshanī, a Persian astronomer and mathematician
 1431 AH - Mohammad Hassan Ahmadi Faqih, an Iranian Twelver Shi'a Marja and professor of Qom Seminary

Holidays and observances
 The first Qadr Night of Ramadan according to Shiites, holding an official nightlife worship ceremony called Ehya night in Iran

See also
 21 Ramadan
 23 Ramadan
 13 Rajab

References

Islamic calendar